Hellenic FC is a South African association football club based in Cape Town. They were nicknamed The Greek Gods.

Established in 1958 by Greek South Africans, Hellenic campaigned in the lower amateur leagues of Cape Town. But by the 1970s they were one of the leading teams in the country and regularly pulled in crowds of more than 20,000. They were champions in 1971 and runners-up in 1972 and 1975. Hellenic reached the final of the Cup competition then widely known as Castle Cup in 1976, losing 2–0 to Cape Town City. In 1994 Hellenic lost the final of the NSL/PSL League Cup, then known as Coca-Cola Cup, losing to QwaQwa Stars 2–3 after extra time.

In 1972 Hellenic attracted a number of German internationals who were barred from playing in clubs associated with FIFA due to their involvement in a match fixing scandal.

In early 2004, the club's franchise was sold by the Greek owners to the Ndlovu family who renamed it Premier United and moved it to Benoni, Gauteng, which was renamed to Thanda Royal Zulu FC in 2007. In 2011, the Hellenic franchise took over the former Blaauwberg City FC, under the management of Mark Byrne. Byrne is looking to revive the quality of the 1970s, to become one of the best youth developments in the country. In 2013, the club acquired a SAB League franchise (South African 4th Division). In August 2016, the club announced that they had sold their SAFA Second Division franchise to "achieving our aim to be the number one youth structure in Cape Town."

Formerly at home at the Green Point Stadium, Hellenic's base these days is the Tygerhof Milnerton.

Honours
 National Championship (NFL): 1971
 Runners-up: 1972, 1975
Cup (NFL)
 Runners-up: 1976
 UTC Bowl: 1972
 Runners-up: 1971
 NSL/PSL League Cup
 Runners-up: 1994

Notable personnel
Players
  Wilf de Bruin (1970–1983/194 goals)
  Dale Liesching (1975 – 1982/86 goals)
  Sergio Dos Santos (1968–1976)
  George Eastham (1971–1972/Player of the Year 1971)
  Volkmar Groß (1972)
  Roger Hunt (1971)
  Arno Steffenhagen (1972)
  Bernd Patzke (1973)
 Ian St John (1971)
 Richard Anderson (Ziggy) (1969–1971)
Coaches
 Budgie Byrne (1970s–80s)
 Bruce Grobbelaar (2001)
 Ian Towers (1982–1985)
  Zoran Pešić (2002)

Premier Soccer League record
2003/2004 – 15th
2002/2003 – 14th
2001/2002 – 16th
2000/2001 – 14th
1999/2000 – 8th
1998/1999 – 12th
1997/1998 – 10th
1996/1997 – 4th

See also
 National Football League (South Africa)
 Castle Cup football

Link
 A collection of Hellenic Football Club photographs
 Ian King, Josef Bobrowsky: South Africa Cup Winners, Rec.Sport.Soccer Statistics Foundation, 25 February 2001

References

 
Association football clubs established in 1958
Association football clubs disestablished in 2004
Defunct soccer clubs in South Africa
Soccer clubs in Cape Town
National Football League (South Africa) clubs
1958 establishments in South Africa
2004 disestablishments in South Africa
Diaspora sports clubs